Pianottoli-Caldarello is a commune in the Corse-du-Sud department of France on the island of Corsica.

It is part of the canton of Grand Sud.

Geography
Originally named Caldarello, it was detached from Zérubia in 1864 then changed its name in 1921. The commune comprises predominantly shoreline with the Bay of Figari to the east, Point Capineru, the small islands of Bruzzi (a nature reserve) and two deep coves (Chevanu and Arbitru). A small port is developing near Caldarello to the east.

Population

Sights
Torra di Caldarellu

See also
Communes of the Corse-du-Sud department

References

Communes of Corse-du-Sud
Corse-du-Sud communes articles needing translation from French Wikipedia